The Braille pattern dots-16 is a 6-dot braille cell with the top left and bottom right dots raised, or an 8-dot braille cell with the top left and lower-middle right dots raised. It is represented by the Unicode code point U+2821, and in Braille ASCII with the asterisk: *.

Unified Braille

In unified international braille, the braille pattern dots-16 is used to represent the unvoiced alveolar or palatal affricate, such as /tʃ/ or /tɕ/, or otherwise as needed.

Table of unified braille values

Other braille

Plus dots 7 and 8

Related to Braille pattern dots-16 are Braille patterns 167, 168, and 1678, which are used in 8-dot braille systems, such as Gardner-Salinas and Luxembourgish Braille.

Related 8-dot kantenji patterns

In the Japanese kantenji braille, the standard 8-dot Braille patterns 28, 128, 248, and 1248 are the patterns related to Braille pattern dots-16, since the two additional dots of kantenji patterns 016, 167, and 0167 are placed above the base 6-dot cell, instead of below, as in standard 8-dot braille.

Kantenji using braille patterns 28, 128, 248, or 1248

This listing includes kantenji using Braille pattern dots-16 for all 6349 kanji found in JIS C 6226-1978.

  - 金

Variants and thematic compounds

  -  selector 1 + か/金  =  于
  -  selector 3 + か/金  =  咼
  -  selector 4 + か/金  =  干
  -  selector 5 + か/金  =  朱
  -  selector 6 + か/金  =  瓦
  -  か/金 + selector 1  =  川
  -  か/金 + selector 4  =  州
  -  か/金 + selector 5  =  鈎
  -  か/金 + selector 6  =  鉢
  -  比 + か/金  =  可
  -  し/巿 + か/金  =  赤

Compounds of 金

  -  ん/止 + か/金  =  欽
  -  か/金 + て/扌  =  釘
  -  か/金 + ち/竹  =  釜
  -  か/金 + ろ/十  =  針
  -  か/金 + も/門  =  釣
  -  か/金 + ふ/女  =  鈍
  -  か/金 + 日  =  鈴
  -  か/金 + け/犬  =  鉄
  -  か/金 + か/金 + け/犬  =  鐵
  -  か/金 + え/訁  =  鉛
  -  か/金 + こ/子  =  鉱
  -  か/金 + か/金 + こ/子  =  鑛
  -  か/金 + む/車  =  鉾
  -  か/金 + や/疒  =  銀
  -  か/金 + 龸  =  銃
  -  か/金 + と/戸  =  銅
  -  か/金 + つ/土  =  銑
  -  か/金 + れ/口  =  銘
  -  か/金 + 囗  =  銭
  -  か/金 + か/金 + 囗  =  錢
  -  か/金 + ほ/方  =  鋒
  -  か/金 + 宿  =  鋭
  -  か/金 + し/巿  =  鋳
  -  か/金 + か/金 + し/巿  =  鑄
  -  か/金 + ゆ/彳  =  鋼
  -  か/金 + せ/食  =  錆
  -  か/金 + い/糹/#2  =  錐
  -  か/金 + に/氵  =  錘
  -  か/金 + よ/广  =  錠
  -  か/金 + く/艹  =  錨
  -  か/金 + 数  =  錫
  -  か/金 + ひ/辶  =  錬
  -  か/金 + ね/示  =  錯
  -  か/金 + み/耳  =  録
  -  か/金 + の/禾  =  鍛
  -  か/金 + は/辶  =  鍵
  -  か/金 + ま/石  =  鎌
  -  か/金 + を/貝  =  鎖
  -  か/金 + め/目  =  鎮
  -  か/金 + か/金 + め/目  =  鎭
  -  か/金 + な/亻  =  鏡
  -  か/金 + り/分  =  鐘
  -  か/金 + ⺼  =  鑑
  -  か/金 + か/金 + ⺼  =  鑒
  -  か/金 + 宿 + ぬ/力  =  劉
  -  れ/口 + 宿 + か/金  =  嚠
  -  や/疒 + 宿 + か/金  =  崟
  -  氷/氵 + 宿 + か/金  =  淦
  -  に/氵 + 龸 + か/金  =  瀏
  -  か/金 + selector 4 + ぬ/力  =  釖
  -  か/金 + 龸 + ぬ/力  =  釛
  -  か/金 + 数 + り/分  =  釟
  -  か/金 + 宿 + ち/竹  =  釡
  -  か/金 + 宿 + れ/口  =  釦
  -  か/金 + selector 1 + ゑ/訁  =  釵
  -  か/金 + selector 4 + ち/竹  =  釶
  -  か/金 + selector 1 + ぬ/力  =  釼
  -  か/金 + 比 + を/貝  =  釿
  -  か/金 + は/辶 + ん/止  =  鈑
  -  か/金 + ほ/方 + そ/馬  =  鈔
  -  か/金 + selector 6 + そ/馬  =  鈕
  -  か/金 + 宿 + も/門  =  鈞
  -  か/金 + 宿 + と/戸  =  鈩
  -  か/金 + 比 + た/⽥  =  鈬
  -  か/金 + れ/口 + ろ/十  =  鈷
  -  か/金 + 龸 + た/⽥  =  鈿
  -  か/金 + selector 1 + す/発  =  鉅
  -  か/金 + 宿 + ひ/辶  =  鉈
  -  か/金 + 龸 + ゐ/幺  =  鉉
  -  か/金 + 龸 + ま/石  =  鉐
  -  か/金 + selector 4 + る/忄  =  鉗
  -  か/金 + 宿 + さ/阝  =  鉚
  -  か/金 + 龸 + ひ/辶  =  鉞
  -  か/金 + ん/止 + い/糹/#2  =  鉦
  -  か/金 + り/分 + へ/⺩  =  銓
  -  か/金 + ゆ/彳 + な/亻  =  銕
  -  か/金 + 数 + 宿  =  銚
  -  か/金 + れ/口 + せ/食  =  銛
  -  か/金 + 龸 + ゆ/彳  =  銜
  -  か/金 + そ/馬 + ⺼  =  銷
  -  か/金 + の/禾 + ゐ/幺  =  銹
  -  か/金 + 宿 + な/亻  =  鋏
  -  か/金 + ぬ/力 + そ/馬  =  鋤
  -  か/金 + selector 5 + ほ/方  =  鋩
  -  か/金 + 宿 + ほ/方  =  鋪
  -  か/金 + く/艹 + り/分  =  鋲
  -  か/金 + と/戸 + selector 1  =  鋸
  -  か/金 + 宿 + う/宀/#3  =  鋺
  -  か/金 + selector 1 + selector 1  =  錏
  -  か/金 + ら/月 + た/⽥  =  錙
  -  か/金 + そ/馬 + 宿  =  錚
  -  か/金 + 宿 + ゑ/訁  =  錣
  -  か/金 + 宿 + め/目  =  錦
  -  か/金 + 囗 + ろ/十  =  錮
  -  か/金 + く/艹 + 比  =  錵
  -  か/金 + く/艹 + ほ/方  =  錺
  -  か/金 + 囗 + ん/止  =  錻
  -  か/金 + 龸 + れ/口  =  鍄
  -  か/金 + 宿 + か/金  =  鍋
  -  か/金 + よ/广 + ゑ/訁  =  鍍
  -  か/金 + 宿 + け/犬  =  鍔
  -  か/金 + selector 1 + き/木  =  鍖
  -  か/金 + 龸 + の/禾  =  鍜
  -  か/金 + 日 + へ/⺩  =  鍠
  -  か/金 + の/禾 + 火  =  鍬
  -  か/金 + 宿 + ゆ/彳  =  鍮
  -  か/金 + ひ/辶 + selector 3  =  鍼
  -  か/金 + 龸 + り/分  =  鍾
  -  か/金 + う/宀/#3 + た/⽥  =  鎔
  -  か/金 + り/分 + お/頁  =  鎗
  -  か/金 + ひ/辶 + ら/月  =  鎚
  -  か/金 + 宿 + や/疒  =  鎧
  -  か/金 + 比 + え/訁  =  鎬
  -  か/金 + り/分 + ⺼  =  鎰
  -  か/金 + ひ/辶 + け/犬  =  鎹
  -  か/金 + ほ/方 + や/疒  =  鏃
  -  か/金 + ひ/辶 + む/車  =  鏈
  -  か/金 + む/車 + selector 2  =  鏐
  -  か/金 + 宿 + お/頁  =  鏑
  -  か/金 + そ/馬 + 比  =  鏖
  -  か/金 + つ/土 + す/発  =  鏗
  -  か/金 + へ/⺩ + selector 2  =  鏘
  -  か/金 + 宿 + ま/石  =  鏝
  -  か/金 + 宿 + る/忄  =  鏤
  -  か/金 + 宿 + 宿  =  鏥
  -  か/金 + む/車 + を/貝  =  鏨
  -  か/金 + 宿 + つ/土  =  鐃
  -  か/金 + の/禾 + た/⽥  =  鐇
  -  か/金 + 宿 + ろ/十  =  鐐
  -  か/金 + 宿 + 氷/氵  =  鐓
  -  か/金 + 日 + ろ/十  =  鐔
  -  か/金 + す/発 + と/戸  =  鐙
  -  か/金 + selector 1 + 心  =  鐚
  -  か/金 + う/宀/#3 + け/犬  =  鐡
  -  か/金 + 宿 + い/糹/#2  =  鐫
  -  か/金 + 龸 + る/忄  =  鐶
  -  か/金 + 宿 + た/⽥  =  鐸
  -  か/金 + 龸 + ふ/女  =  鐺
  -  か/金 + す/発 + selector 4  =  鑁
  -  か/金 + は/辶 + ら/月  =  鑓
  -  か/金 + を/貝 + け/犬  =  鑚
  -  か/金 + 龸 + ろ/十  =  鑞
  -  か/金 + 日 + ゐ/幺  =  鑠
  -  か/金 + す/発 + 心  =  鑢
  -  か/金 + 宿 + す/発  =  鑪
  -  か/金 + 宿 + り/分  =  鑰
  -  か/金 + 龸 + け/犬  =  鑵
  -  か/金 + 宿 + み/耳  =  鑷
  -  か/金 + す/発 + い/糹/#2  =  鑼
  -  か/金 + 宿 + を/貝  =  鑽
  -  か/金 + 宿 + え/訁  =  鑾
  -  か/金 + 宿 + の/禾  =  鑿
  -  か/金 + め/目 + め/目  =  钁

Compounds of 于

  -  宿 + か/金  =  宇
  -  い/糹/#2 + か/金  =  紆
  -  心 + か/金  =  芋
  -  れ/口 + selector 1 + か/金  =  吁
  -  か/金 + 宿 + ⺼  =  盂
  -  は/辶 + 宿 + か/金  =  迂

Compounds of 咼

  -  ね/示 + か/金  =  禍
  -  ひ/辶 + か/金  =  過
  -  か/金 + ら/月  =  骨
  -  か/金 + ゐ/幺  =  骸
  -  心 + か/金 + ら/月  =  榾
  -  け/犬 + か/金 + ら/月  =  猾
  -  ま/石 + か/金 + ら/月  =  磆
  -  か/金 + か/金 + ら/月  =  骭
  -  の/禾 + か/金 + ら/月  =  骰
  -  数 + か/金 + ら/月  =  髏
  -  む/車 + か/金 + ら/月  =  髑
  -  か/金 + か/金 + ら/月  =  骭
  -  つ/土 + 宿 + か/金  =  堝
  -  に/氵 + 宿 + か/金  =  渦
  -  か/金 + う/宀/#3 + り/分  =  窩
  -  心 + 宿 + か/金  =  萵
  -  む/車 + 宿 + か/金  =  蝸
  -  か/金 + す/発 + れ/口  =  骼
  -  か/金 + た/⽥ + さ/阝  =  髀
  -  か/金 + 宿 + せ/食  =  鶻

Compounds of 干

  -  ふ/女 + か/金  =  奸
  -  や/疒 + か/金  =  岸
  -  り/分 + か/金  =  平
  -  や/疒 + り/分 + か/金  =  岼
  -  る/忄 + り/分 + か/金  =  怦
  -  に/氵 + り/分 + か/金  =  泙
  -  く/艹 + り/分 + か/金  =  萍
  -  の/禾 + り/分 + か/金  =  秤
  -  心 + り/分 + か/金  =  苹
  -  せ/食 + り/分 + か/金  =  鮃
  -  ろ/十 + か/金  =  幹
  -  に/氵 + ろ/十 + か/金  =  澣
  -  氷/氵 + か/金  =  汗
  -  ち/竹 + か/金  =  竿
  -  ⺼ + か/金  =  肝
  -  む/車 + か/金  =  軒
  -  か/金 + ぬ/力  =  刊
  -  日 + selector 4 + か/金  =  旱
  -  る/忄 + か/金  =  悍
  -  て/扌 + selector 4 + か/金  =  捍
  -  の/禾 + selector 4 + か/金  =  稈
  -  て/扌 + 宿 + か/金  =  扞
  -  き/木 + 宿 + か/金  =  杆
  -  き/木 + selector 4 + か/金  =  栞
  -  き/木 + う/宀/#3 + か/金  =  桿
  -  す/発 + selector 4 + か/金  =  罕
  -  え/訁 + 宿 + か/金  =  訐
  -  そ/馬 + 宿 + か/金  =  駻
  -  か/金 + め/目 + た/⽥  =  鼾

Compounds of 朱

  -  き/木 + か/金  =  株
  -  ほ/方 + か/金  =  殊
  -  へ/⺩ + か/金  =  珠
  -  な/亻 + selector 5 + か/金  =  侏
  -  に/氵 + selector 5 + か/金  =  洙
  -  心 + selector 5 + か/金  =  茱
  -  む/車 + selector 5 + か/金  =  蛛
  -  え/訁 + selector 5 + か/金  =  誅
  -  か/金 + selector 5 + か/金  =  銖

Compounds of 瓦

  -  と/戸 + か/金  =  瓶
  -  か/金 + お/頁  =  瓩
  -  の/禾 + selector 6 + か/金  =  甃
  -  も/門 + selector 6 + か/金  =  甌
  -  う/宀/#3 + selector 6 + か/金  =  甍
  -  そ/馬 + selector 6 + か/金  =  甑
  -  ま/石 + selector 6 + か/金  =  甓
  -  ひ/辶 + selector 6 + か/金  =  甕
  -  か/金 + う/宀/#3 + ろ/十  =  瓧
  -  か/金 + selector 6 + こ/子  =  瓮
  -  か/金 + う/宀/#3 + 日  =  瓰
  -  か/金 + selector 4 + せ/食  =  瓱
  -  か/金 + 比 + ふ/女  =  瓲
  -  か/金 + 氷/氵 + ん/止  =  瓷
  -  か/金 + 数 + め/目  =  瓸
  -  か/金 + 比 + に/氵  =  甄
  -  か/金 + よ/广 + り/分  =  甅
  -  か/金 + selector 4 + て/扌  =  甎

Compounds of 川

  -  か/金 + 宿 + selector 1  =  巛
  -  は/辶 + か/金  =  巡
  -  ゑ/訁 + か/金  =  訓
  -  お/頁 + か/金  =  順
  -  か/金 + 火  =  災
  -  か/金 + た/⽥  =  拶
  -  か/金 + か/金 + selector 1  =  釧
  -  か/金 + き/木  =  巣
  -  ね/示 + か/金 + き/木  =  剿
  -  ぬ/力 + か/金 + き/木  =  勦
  -  き/木 + か/金 + き/木  =  樔

Compounds of 州

  -  せ/食 + か/金  =  酬
  -  に/氵 + か/金 + selector 4  =  洲
  -  そ/馬 + か/金 + selector 4  =  駲

Compounds of 鈎

  -  か/金 + も/門 + selector 5  =  鉤
  -  か/金 + も/門 + selector 2  =  鉋

Compounds of 可

  -  な/亻 + か/金  =  何
  -  囗 + か/金  =  呵
  -  け/犬 + か/金  =  奇
  -  う/宀/#3 + か/金  =  寄
  -  そ/馬 + か/金  =  騎
  -  な/亻 + け/犬 + か/金  =  倚
  -  ぬ/力 + け/犬 + か/金  =  剞
  -  て/扌 + け/犬 + か/金  =  掎
  -  ん/止 + け/犬 + か/金  =  欹
  -  け/犬 + け/犬 + か/金  =  猗
  -  た/⽥ + け/犬 + か/金  =  畸
  -  selector 1 + け/犬 + か/金  =  竒
  -  い/糹/#2 + け/犬 + か/金  =  綺
  -  す/発 + け/犬 + か/金  =  羇
  -  に/氵 + か/金  =  河
  -  さ/阝 + か/金  =  阿
  -  ふ/女 + さ/阝 + か/金  =  婀
  -  や/疒 + さ/阝 + か/金  =  痾
  -  か/金 + 比 + か/金  =  哥
  -  か/金 + ん/止  =  歌
  -  ゆ/彳 + 比 + か/金  =  彁
  -  え/訁 + か/金 + ん/止  =  謌
  -  き/木 + 比 + か/金  =  柯
  -  に/氵 + 比 + か/金  =  渮
  -  へ/⺩ + 比 + か/金  =  珂
  -  ふ/女 + 比 + か/金  =  舸
  -  く/艹 + 比 + か/金  =  苛
  -  え/訁 + 比 + か/金  =  訶
  -  む/車 + 比 + か/金  =  軻

Compounds of 赤

  -  か/金 + か/金  =  赫
  -  れ/口 + か/金  =  嚇
  -  か/金 + 氷/氵  =  赦
  -  む/車 + か/金 + 氷/氵  =  螫
  -  お/頁 + し/巿 + か/金  =  赧
  -  か/金 + と/戸 + 日  =  赭

Other compounds

  -  て/扌 + か/金  =  揺
  -  て/扌 + て/扌 + か/金  =  搖
  -  え/訁 + か/金  =  謡
  -  え/訁 + え/訁 + か/金  =  謠
  -  ゆ/彳 + 龸 + か/金  =  徭
  -  へ/⺩ + 宿 + か/金  =  瑶
  -  ひ/辶 + 宿 + か/金  =  遥
  -  か/金 + 龸 + せ/食  =  鷂
  -  た/⽥ + か/金  =  畢
  -  み/耳 + た/⽥ + か/金  =  蹕
  -  く/艹 + か/金  =  華
  -  れ/口 + く/艹 + か/金  =  嘩
  -  日 + く/艹 + か/金  =  曄
  -  心 + く/艹 + か/金  =  樺
  -  え/訁 + く/艹 + か/金  =  譁
  -  や/疒 + う/宀/#3 + か/金  =  崋
  -  日 + か/金  =  年
  -  つ/土 + か/金  =  幸
  -  な/亻 + つ/土 + か/金  =  倖
  -  囗 + つ/土 + か/金  =  圉
  -  す/発 + つ/土 + か/金  =  睾
  -  す/発 + か/金  =  虐
  -  や/疒 + す/発 + か/金  =  瘧
  -  え/訁 + す/発 + か/金  =  謔
  -  ら/月 + か/金  =  勝
  -  め/目 + か/金  =  看
  -  の/禾 + か/金  =  糧
  -  て/扌 + ら/月 + か/金  =  捷

Notes

Braille patterns